Sir Edmund Filmer, 8th Baronet (14 June 1809 – 8 January 1857) was an English Conservative Party politician.

Life
He was the son of Edmund Filmer, a younger son of Sir Edmund Filmer, 6th Baronet, and his wife Emelia Skene, daughter of George Skene. He matriculated in 1827 at Oriel College, Oxford.

Filmer was elected to the House of Commons at a by-election in March 1838 as a Member of Parliament (MP) for West Kent, having unsuccessfully contested the same constituency at the 1837 general election. He held the seat until his death in 1857, aged 47. His son the 9th Baronet was elected as MP for West Kent in 1859.

In 1850 Sir Edmund built Leagrave Hall on land close to Luton in Bedfordshire which had been purchased in 1771 by Sir Beversham Filmer.

Arms

References

External links 
 

1809 births
1857 deaths
Baronets in the Baronetage of England
Conservative Party (UK) MPs for English constituencies
UK MPs 1837–1841
UK MPs 1841–1847
UK MPs 1847–1852
UK MPs 1852–1857